Praerosaria is an extinct genus of gastropods belonging to the subfamily Erosariinae of the family Cypraeidae.

Species
 † Praerosaria amoenacea Dolin & Lozouet, 2004 
 † Praerosaria besucus Pacaud, 2018 
 † Praerosaria biacuta Dolin & Lozouet, 2004 
 † Praerosaria borysthenis Pacaud, 2018 
 † Praerosaria charlenae Dolin & Lozouet, 2004 
 † Praerosaria espibosensis Dolin & Lozouet, 2004 
 † Praerosaria exflaveola (Sacco, 1894) 
 † Praerosaria herosae Dolin & Lozouet, 2004 
 † Praerosaria paulonaria Dolin & Lozouet, 2004 
 † Praerosaria perlacea Dolin & Lozouet, 2004 
 † Praerosaria pseudorugosa Dolin & Lozouet, 2004
 † Praerosaria stampinensis (Sacco, 1894) 
 † Praerosaria stefanskyii Pacaud, 2018 
 † Praerosaria tabulata Dolin & Lozouet, 2004 
 † Praerosaria virodunensis Dolin & Lozouet, 2004

References

 Dolin L. & Lozouet P. (2004). Nouvelles espèces de gastéropodes (Mollusca: Gastropoda) de l'Oligocène et du Miocène inférieur de l'Aquitaine (Sud-Ouest de la France). Partie 3. Cypraeidae et Ovulidae. Cossmanniana. Hors-série 4: 1–164.
 Pacaud J.M. (2018). Les Cypraeoidea (Mollusca, Caenogastropoda) du Priabonien (Éocène supérieur) de Dnipro (Oblast de Dnipropetrovsk, Ukraine). Partie 1 : Cypraeidae. Xenophora Taxonomy. 20: 14–33.

External links

Cypraeidae